The Sapa mabouya (Eutropis chapaensis) is a species of skink found in Vietnam.

References

Eutropis
Reptiles described in 1937
Reptiles of Vietnam
Endemic fauna of Vietnam
Taxa named by René Léon Bourret